Timothy Pitkin (January 21, 1766 in Farmington, Connecticut – December 18, 1847 in New Haven, Connecticut) was an American lawyer, politician, and historian.

He graduated from Yale in 1785, taught in the academy at Plainfield, Connecticut for a year, studied law, and was admitted to the bar in 1788. He served in the State Legislature of Connecticut in 1790, 1792, and 1794‑1805, serving as Clerk of the House 1800‑1802 and as Speaker 1803‑1805. He was elected as a Federalist to the United States Congress in the Ninth Congress to fill in part the vacancies caused by the resignations of Calvin Goddard and Roger Griswold; and was reëlected to the Tenth and to the five succeeding Congresses, thus serving from September 16, 1805, to March 3, 1819.

Pitkin was elected a member of the American Antiquarian Society in 1815.

He was not a candidate for renomination to the Federal Congress in 1818, but was a delegate to the convention which framed the new State constitution in that year. Resuming his private law practice, he also returned to serve as a member of the Connecticut State House of Representatives from 1819 to 1830. His writing on and gathering of statistical materials are the accomplishments which accord him a special place in the history of the United States. Written with great care, A Statistical View of the Commerce of the United States of America (1816) and Political and Civil History of the United States from 1763 to the Close of Washington's Administration (2 volumes, 1828) are valuable reference works for students of American history. He is buried in New Haven, in Grove Street Cemetery.

He was the maternal uncle of Roger Sherman Baldwin's wife Emily Pitkin Perkins.

References

External links
Timothy Pitkin - U.S. Congressional Biographical Information
Timothy Pitkin, Connecticut State Library

''It also incorporates text from the Biographical Directory of the United States Congress, also in the public domain.

1766 births
1847 deaths
People from Farmington, Connecticut
Speakers of the Connecticut House of Representatives
Connecticut lawyers
Yale University alumni
Burials at Grove Street Cemetery
Federalist Party members of the United States House of Representatives from Connecticut
Members of the American Antiquarian Society
19th-century American lawyers
Historians from Connecticut